Mount Bursey is a broad, ice-covered mountain,  high, which forms the eastern end of the Flood Range in Marie Byrd Land, Antarctica.

It was discovered by members of the United States Antarctic Service (USAS) on aerial flights in 1940, and named for Jacob Bursey, member of the Byrd Antarctic Expedition (1928–30) and dog-driver with the USAS party which sledged to the west end of the Flood Range in December 1940.

Volcanism
Mount Bursey consists of two coalescing shield volcanoes, namely Hutt Peak and Koerner Bluff. Each shield contains a  diameter caldera at its summit. Potassium–argon dating has indicated both shields formed during the Miocene epoch, with volcanism at Hutt Peak occurring as recently as 0.49 million years ago.

Starbuck Crater is a volcanic cone on the mountain.

Named features 
Several features of Mount Bursey have been named by various groups of surveyors and explorers.

Along the mountain's northwest margin lies Koerner Bluff, a bare rock bluff. Below Koener Bluff, about one mile (1.6 km) to the north, sits Syrstad Rock, a rock outcrop.

Both features were first mapped by the United States Geological Survey (USGS) from surveys and U.S. Navy air photos collected from 1959 to 1965, and were named by the Advisory Committee on Antarctic Names (US-ACAN). Koerner Bluff was named  for Roy M. Koerner, a United States Antarctic Research Program (USARP) glaciologist with the Byrd Station Traverse, 1962–63. Syrstad Rock was named for Erik Syrstad, ionospheric physicist at South Pole Station, 1970.

See also
 List of volcanoes in Antarctica

References

Flood Range
Volcanoes of Marie Byrd Land
Calderas of Antarctica
Polygenetic shield volcanoes
Miocene shield volcanoes
Pleistocene shield volcanoes